The McDowell News is an English language newspaper published daily in Marion, North Carolina, United States, covering McDowell County. The newspaper is currently owned by Lee Enterprises, it was previously owned by Berkshire Hathaway's subsidiary BH Media Group since 2012, and by Media General before that. Lee Enterprises bought BH Media Group's publications in early 2020. The McDowell News is a member of the North Carolina Press Association.  The McDowell News has a Facebook page for sharing news and interacting with readers.

See also
 List of newspapers in North Carolina

References

External links
 

1923 establishments in North Carolina
Daily newspapers published in North Carolina
Lee Enterprises publications
McDowell County, North Carolina
Newspapers established in 1923